The 2002–03 season was the 71st season in the existence of FC Metz and the club's first season back in the second division of French football. In addition to the domestic league, Metz participated in this season's editions of the Coupe de France and the Coupe de la Ligue. The season covered the period from 1 July 2002 to 30 June 2003.

Transfers

In

Out

Competitions

Overall record

Ligue 2

League table

Results summary

Results by round

Matches

Coupe de France

Coupe de la Ligue

Statistics

Goalscorers

References

FC Metz seasons
Metz